James Hendry Dougall (24 September 1898 – 1966) was a Scottish professional footballer who made over 220 appearances in the Football League for Coventry City as an outside right. He is a member of the Coventry City Hall of Fame and also played League football for Reading. Dougall was described as "a tricky winger whose accurate crosses resulted in many goals".

Personal life 
Dougall had six sons, two of whom (Tommy and Gordon) also became footballers.

Career statistics

Honours 

 Coventry City Hall of Fame

References 

English Football League players
Scottish footballers
1898 births
Sportspeople from Wishaw
Association football outside forwards
Date of death missing
Motherwell F.C. players
Coventry City F.C. players
Reading F.C. players
Footballers from North Lanarkshire